Rana Ismail (born 20 July 2002 in Dubai) is an Egyptian professional squash player. As of July 2022, she was ranked number 99 in the world.

References

2002 births
Living people
Egyptian female squash players
21st-century Egyptian women